This is a list of Bangladeshi films that are scheduled to release in 2020. Some films have announced release dates but have yet to begin filming, while others are in production but do not yet have definite release dates.Super Star Shakib khan Has 2 Movie in this year

Box office collection 
The highest-grossing Bangladeshi films released in 2020, by worldwide box office gross revenue, are as follows.

Released

January – May

October - December

See also

 List of Bangladeshi films of 2019
 List of Bangladeshi films
 Cinema of Bangladesh

References

Film
Lists of 2020 films by country or language
 2020